John Joseph Albert Bliss (January 9, 1882 – October 23, 1968) was a professional baseball player. He played all or part of five seasons in Major League Baseball, from 1908 until 1912, for the St. Louis Cardinals, primarily as a catcher. He spent most of his career as a reserve, but was the Cardinals' primary catcher in 1911.

Sources

Major League Baseball catchers
St. Louis Cardinals players
Oakland Reliance players
Oakland (minor league baseball) players
Oakland Oaks (baseball) players
Los Angeles Angels (minor league) players
Sacramento Sacts players
Venice Tigers players
Baseball players from Washington (state)
1882 births
1968 deaths
Burials at Forest Lawn Memorial Park (Glendale)
Sportspeople from Vancouver, Washington
El Paso Mackmen players